Michael A. Hogg (born 1954) is a British psychologist, and Professor of Social Psychology in the Department of Psychology at Claremont Graduate University in Los Angeles. He is also an honorary Professor of Social Psychology at the University of Kent in the UK.

Biography
Hogg was born in 1954 in Calcutta, India, where his parents (his father was Scottish, his mother English and Welsh) were employed at the time of his birth. When he was about two his family moved to Colombo in Sri Lanka where he attended the Overseas International School in Colombo and then the Hill School in Nuwara Eliya.

In 1968 the family moved back to England. After one term at Warwick Grammar School the family moved to Bristol where Hogg attended Bristol Grammar School until he graduated in 1973. He then studied Physics for a year at the University of Birmingham, and then transferred to study Psychology and graduated with his BSc in 1977. After a year traveling around south and central America Hogg returned to England in 1978 to embark on his PhD in social psychology at Bristol University. He received his PhD (dated 1983) and taught at Bristol University for 3 years before moving to Australia in 1985 to a postdoctoral fellowship at Macquarie University in Sydney. In 1986 he moved to a faculty position at Melbourne University, and then in 1991 he moved to the University of Queensland where he remained until moving to California in 2006. He currently teaches at Claremont Graduate University in Claremont, California.

Hogg received the Australian Psychological Society's early career award in 1989, and the Society for Personality and Social Psychology's mid-career Carol and Ed Diener award in 2010. In 2013 he served as President of the Society of Experimental Social Psychology. He is also the foundation editor, with Dominic Abrams at the University of Kent, of the journal Group Processes and Intergroup Relations - first published in 1996.

In August 2010 the Personality and Social Psychology Bulletin ranked Hogg the 9th most influential social psychologist. Researchers ranked 611 faculty members at 97 universities across the United States and Canada using complex formulas that measured the frequency with which the faculty member published work and how often that work is cited. These formulas included adjustments to account for a researcher's experience in terms of how many years it has been since an individual earned a PhD.

Work
Hogg's research focus is on social identity theory, a theory that was initially developed in the 1970's and first most fully published by Henri Tajfel and John Turner in 1979. Social identity theory was created to explain how and why people identify with particular social groups, and the various ways these identities affect people's perceptions, attitudes and behaviors. It provides a social psychological understanding of group processes and intergroup relations. While at Queensland, Hogg established and directed the Center for Research on Group Processes, and soon after arriving in Claremont set up the Social Identity Lab in the School of Behavioral and Organizational Sciences at Claremont Graduate University.

Research by Hogg and his students in the Social Identity Lab takes a self and social identity perspective on a wide range of topics associated with intergroup relations and the behavior of people in groups. One key focus is on how uncertainty drives people to groups and ideologies that resolve these uncertainties; another is on processes of influence and leadership within and between groups. Current research also seeks to understand radicalization and populism, mechanisms of group integration and disintegration, and how leadership can heal divided groups.

Bibliography
Recent Hogg publications include:

 
 
 
 Hogg, M. A. (2007). "Social psychology of leadership." In A. W. Kruglanski & E. T. Higgins (Eds.), Social Psychology: Handbook of Basic Principles (2nd ed., pp. 716–733). New York: Guilford.
 
 Hogg, M. A. (2006). "Social identity theory." In P. J. Burke (Ed.), Contemporary Social Psychological Theories (pp. 111–136). Palo Alto, CA: Stanford University Press.

References

1954 births
Living people
Australian psychologists
Educational psychologists
Academics of the University of Kent
Medical doctors from Kolkata
Alumni of the University of Bristol
Academic staff of the University of Queensland
Claremont Graduate University faculty